3-dehydroquinate synthase II (DHQ synthase II, MJ1249 (gene), aroB' (gene)) is an enzyme with systematic name 2-amino-3,7-dideoxy-D-threo-hept-6-ulosonate:NAD+ oxidoreductase (deaminating). This enzyme catalyses the following chemical reaction

 2-amino-3,7-dideoxy-D-threo-hept-6-ulosonate + H2O + NAD+  3-dehydroquinate + NH3 + NADH + H+

The enzyme was isolated from the archaeon Methanocaldococcus jannaschii.

References

External links 
 

EC 1.4.1